Shorea smithiana (called, along with some other species in the genus Shorea, light red meranti) is a large emergent rainforest tree species in the Dipterocarpaceae. Shorea smithiana is endemic to Borneo. It is threatened by habitat loss. The tallest measured specimen is 82.3 m tall in the Tawau Hills National Park, in Sabah, Borneo.

References

smithiana
Endemic flora of Borneo
Trees of Borneo
Taxonomy articles created by Polbot